Iosactinidae is a family of sea anemones belonging to the order Actiniaria.

Genera:
 Iosactis Riemann-Zürneck, 1997

References

Actinioidea
Cnidarian families